The 2016–17 Troy Trojans men's basketball team represented Troy University during the 2016–17 NCAA Division I men's basketball season. The Trojans, led by fourth-year head coach Phil Cunningham, played their home games at Trojan Arena in Troy, Alabama and were members of the Sun Belt Conference. They finished the season 22–15, 10–8 in Sun Belt play to finish in a three-way tie for sixth place. The defeated Appalachian State, Georgia Southern, Georgia State, and Texas State to win the Sun Belt tournament championship. As a result, they received the conference's automatic bid to the NCAA tournament. As the No. 15 seed in the East region, they lost to Duke in the first round.

Previous season
The Trojans finished the 2015–16 season 9–22, 4–16 in Sun Belt play to finish in last place. They failed to qualify for the Sun Belt tournament.

Roster

Schedule and results

|-
!colspan=9 style=|  Exhibition

|-
!colspan=9 style=| Non-conference regular season

|-
!colspan=9 style=| Sun Belt Conference regular season

|-
!colspan=9 style=| Sun Belt tournament

|-
!colspan=9 style=| NCAA tournament

References

Troy Trojans men's basketball seasons
Troy
Troy
2017 in sports in Alabama
2016 in sports in Alabama